Thomas Nguyễn Văn Tân (December 27, 1940 − August 17, 2013) was a Vietnamese Roman Catholic bishop.

Ordained to the priesthood in 1969, Nguyên Văn Tân was named coadjutor bishop of the Roman Catholic Diocese of Vĩnh Long, Vietnam and then succeeded as diocesan bishop. He died in 2013 while still in office.

References

1940 births
2013 deaths
People from Vĩnh Long province
21st-century Roman Catholic bishops in Vietnam